Abdul Aziz Malik (born 16 April 1916) was a Pakistani field hockey player. He played 23 International matches for Pakistan and scored an impressive 28 goals in his International career . He competed at the 1948 Summer Olympics and the 1952 Summer Olympics.

References

External links
 

1916 births
Possibly living people
Pakistani male field hockey players
Olympic field hockey players of Pakistan
Field hockey players at the 1948 Summer Olympics
Field hockey players at the 1952 Summer Olympics
Field hockey players from Rawalpindi
20th-century Pakistani people